Michael Hogan may refer to:

The arts
 Michael Hogan (Canadian actor) (born 1949), main work includes Battlestar Galactica
 Michael Hogan (poet) (1828–1899), Irish poet
 Michael Hogan (screenwriter) (1893–1977), British actor and screenwriter, films include The Iron Stair and King Solomon's Mines
 Michael Hogan (writer) (born 1943), American writer and poet
 Michael Hogan, American  actor and assistant director, known for The Resident, Chicago P.D. and The Kill Point

Jurists
 Sir Michael Joseph Hogan (1908–1986), Chief Justice of Hong Kong and President of the Court of Appeal of the Bahamas
 Michael Robert Hogan (born 1946), American judge

Politicians
 Michael Hogan (Irish politician) (1853–1935), Member of Parliament for North Tipperary (1906–1910)
 Michael Hogan (Canadian politician) (1872–1943), Canadian politician 
 Michael J. Hogan (1871–1940), American politician

Sportspeople
 Michael Hogan (cricketer) (born 1981), Australian cricketer
 Michael Hogan (Gaelic footballer) (1896–1920), footballer shot dead on Bloody Sunday

Other
 Michael Hogan (academic) (born 1943), American scholar; former president of the University of Illinois
 Michael Hogan (shipowner) (1766–1833), involved in early settlement of Australia

Fictional
 Michael Hogan, a lead character on the American sitcom The Hogan Family, played by actor Josh Taylor
 Michael Hogan (fictional character), a fictional British intelligence officer in the Sharpe series of novels by Bernard Cornwell

See also
Mike Hogan (disambiguation)